The 22109 / 10 Lokmanya Tilak Terminus–Hazrat Nizamuddin AC Express was an AC Superfast Express express train belonging to Indian Railways – Central Railway zone that ran between Lokmanya Tilak Terminus and  in India.

It operated as train number 22109 from Lokmanya Tilak Terminus-Hazrat Nizamuddin and as train number 22110 in the reverse direction, serving the states of Maharashtra, Madhya Pradesh, Uttar Pradesh & Delhi.

Rolling stock
The 22109 / 10 Lokmanya Tilak Terminus–Hazrat Nizamuddin AC Express had 1 AC First Class, 4 AC 2 tier, 12 AC 3 tier & 2 End on Generator coaches. In addition, it carried a pantry car. All the coaches were modern high-speed LHB coach that are manufactured in Rail Coach Factory, Kapurthala and Modern Coach Factory, Raebareli.

As is customary with most train services in India, coach composition may be amended at the discretion of Indian Railways depending on demand.

Service

The 22109 Lokmanya Tilak Terminus–Hazrat Nizamuddin AC Express covered the distance of 1521 kilometres in 19 hours 50 mins (76.69 km/hr) & in 20 hours 00 mins as 22110 Hazrat Nizamuddin–Lokmanya Tilak Terminus AC Express (76.05 km/hr).

As the average speed of the train was above , as per Indian Railways rules, its fare included a Superfast surcharge.

Route
The 22109 / 10 Lokmanya Tilak Terminus–Hazrat Nizamuddin AC Express ran from Lokmanya Tilak Terminus via 
  
 
  
  
  
  
   
to Hazrat Nizamuddin.

Traction
As the entire route is fully electrified, Bhusawal or Itarsi-based WAP-4's or Ajni-based WAP-7s were the traditional locomotives for this train & power the train for its entire journey. It also was occasionally hauled by Bhusaval/Itarsi WAM-4, Ghaziabad/Royapuram/Lallaguda-based WAP-7 and once by a Ghaziabad WAP-5.

Timings
22109 Lokmanya Tilak Terminus–Hazrat Nizamuddin AC Express used to leave Lokmanya Tilak Terminus every Tuesday at 14:30 hrs IST and reached Hazrat Nizamuddin at 10:20 hrs IST the next day.
22110 Hazrat Nizamuddin–Lokmanya Tilak Terminus AC Express used to leave Hazrat Nizamuddin every Wednesday at 15:50 hrs IST and reached Lokmanya Tilak Terminus at 11:50 hrs IST the next day.

Sister trains
 August Kranti Rajdhani Express
 Bandra Terminus–Hazrat Nizamuddin AC Superfast Express
 Bandra Terminus–Hazrat Nizamuddin Garib Rath Express
 Bandra Terminus–Hazrat Nizamuddin Yuva Express
 Delhi Sarai Rohilla–Bandra Terminus Garib Rath Express
 Maharashtra Sampark Kranti Express
 Mumbai–New Delhi Duronto Express
 Mumbai Rajdhani Express
 Mumbai CSMT–Hazrat Nizamuddin Rajdhani Express

References 

 http://nr.indianrailways.gov.in/view_detail.jsp?lang=0&dcd=3203&id=0,4,268
 http://www.cr.indianrailways.gov.in/view_detail.jsp?lang=0&dcd=1514&id=0,4,268
 http://timesofindia.indiatimes.com/city/mumbai/New-AC-train-from-LTT-to-Delhi-every-Tuesday/articleshow/20837615.cms
 http://www.afternoondc.in/city-news/crs-2-superfast-trains-between-ltt-and-hazrat-nizamuddin/article_92849

External links

Delhi–Mumbai trains
Rail transport in Madhya Pradesh
AC Express (Indian Railways) trains